Olivier Carette (born 31 December 1967) is a Belgian former association football and futsal player. With Racing Jet he promoted to the Belgian League in 1986, and he also played in the Belgian top flight for K.S.K. Beveren.

References

1967 births
Living people
Belgian footballers
Association football forwards
Racing Jet Wavre players
K.S.K. Beveren players
Belgian Pro League players
Francs Borains players